Lagerpetidae (originally Lagerpetonidae) is a family of basal avemetatarsalians. Though traditionally considered the earliest-diverging dinosauromorphs (reptiles closer to dinosaurs than to pterosaurs), fossils described in 2020 suggest that lagerpetids may instead be pterosauromorphs (closer to pterosaurs). Lagerpetid fossils are known from the Late Triassic of Argentina, Arizona, Brazil, Madagascar, New Mexico, and Texas. They were typically small, although some lagerpetids, like Dromomeron gigas and a specimen from the Santa Rosa Formation attributed to Dromomeron sp., were able to get quite large (femoral length ). Lagerpetid fossils are rare; the most common finds are bones of the hindlimbs, which possessed a number of unique features.

Description
As with most early avemetatarsalians, the most characteristic adaptations of lagerpetids occurred in their hip, leg and ankle bones, likely as a result of these being the bones most commonly preserved. Hip material is only known in Lagerpeton and Ixalerpeton, which share three adaptations of the ilium (upper blade of the hip). The supraacetabular crest, a ridge of bone which lies above the acetabulum (hip socket), is thickest above the middle portion of the acetabulum, rather than the front of it. However, it also extends further forwards than in most dinosauromorphs, snaking along the length of the pubic peduncle (the area of the ilium which connects to the pubis). The ilium's facet for the pubis opens downwards, a trait also acquired by ornithischian dinosaurs. The hip in general was wide, had a closed acetabulum (i.e. one with a bony inner wall), and had two sacral vertebrae, lacking many specializations of later dinosauromorphs, like dinosaurs.

Like other early archosaurs (and archosaur relatives such as Euparkeria), the femur (thigh bone) was slender and S-shaped. The femoral head was thin when seen from above, and its apex projected about 45 degrees between medially (inwards) and anteriorly (forwards). Most archosaurs had three tubera (bumps) on their flattened femoral head, one at the middle of the anterolateral (forwards/outwards) surface, another at the middle of the posteromedial (backwards/inwards) surface, and a small third one which was near the apex of the femoral head. However, lagerpetids lack the anterolateral tuber, instead having an emargination in the head just below where the tuber would normally be expected. The femoral head itself was notably hook-shaped when seen from the side. The distal portion of the femur (i.e. the portion near the knee) had a pair of condyles (knobs) on either side of the rear surface, as well as a third knob-like structure known as a crista tibiofibularis, which was present just above the lateral condyle. The crista tibiofibularis was uniquely enlarged in lagerpetids, and undergoes further evolution in Ixalerpeton and particularly Dromomeron.

The tibia and fibula (shin bones) were long and thin, with the tibia longer than the femur and generally resembling the tibia of early theropod dinosaurs. The ankle was formed by two main bones: the astragalus (which contacts both the tibia and fibula), and the calcaneum (which only contacts the fibula). As with dinosauromorphs, the astragalus was twice as wide as the reduced calcaneum. In addition, the two bones were co-ossified (fused together), akin to the condition in pterosaurs and some early dinosaurs (coelophysoids, for example). A pair of small, pyramid-shaped structures rise up out of the astragalus, one in front of the facet for the tibia, and the other behind it. The one in front is similar to a structure found in dinosauriform ankles known as the anterior ascending process, and it may be homologous with it. However, the posterior ascending process (the one behind the tibial facet) is entirely unique to lagerpetids. The rear of the astragalus lacks a horizontal groove, similar to Tropidosuchus, theropods, and ornithischians, but unlike most other archosauriforms. Like pterosaurs and dinosaurs (but unlike Marasuchus and most other archosaurs), the facet on the calcaneum which receives the fibula is concave and there is no evidence of a pronounced rearward bump known as a calcaneal tuber.

Classification
The lagerpetids were typically considered relatives of the dinosaurs, as a branch of the group Dinosauromorpha. The family was originally named Lagerpetonidae by Arcucci in 1986, though it was later renamed Lagerpetidae in a phylogenetic study by S. J. Nesbitt and colleagues in 2009. A clade of lagerpetids was also recovered in the large phylogenetic analyses of early dinosaurs and other dinosauromorphs that were produced by Baron, Norman & Barrett (2017). More recently, Muller et al. (2018) carried out the most comprehensive study on lagerpetid phylogeny, which assembled all lagerpetid specimens, taxa and morphotypes known so far into three of the most recent data matrices on early dinosauromorph/archosaur evolution. Finally, Garcia et al. (2019) added an unnamed lagerpetid (a new morphotype) to the data matrices used in the study by Muller et al. (2018).

Cladogram simplified after Cabreira et al., 2016:

By contrast, Kammerer et al. (2020), Ezcurra et al. (2020) recovered Lagerpetidae as the sister clade to pterosaurs, based on newly-described fossils of the jaw, forelimbs, and braincase. Baron (2021) also recovered a similar result.

References

 
Prehistoric avemetatarsalians
Triassic archosaurs
Ladinian first appearances
Norian extinctions
Prehistoric reptile families
Pterosauromorpha